Backcourt or Back court may refer to:
A section of the court in some net and racket sports including;
Back court (tennis)
Backcourt (pickleball)
Backcourt (basketball)